Jack Poorbaugh (November 3, 1919 – June 17, 1987) was an American politician. He served as a Republican member for the 77th and 78th district of the Florida House of Representatives.

Poorbaugh was born in Cleveland, Ohio. Poorbaugh attended Case Western Reserve University and graduated from Washington University in St. Louis. Poorbaugh served in the United States Marine Corps during World War II. After being discharged, he served as an investigator for the United States Senate. He also worked as a general contractor. He moved to Florida in 1960.

In 1967 Poorbaugh became the representative for the newly established 78th district of the Florida House of Representatives. He was succeeded by William G. James in 1968. In the same year Poorbaugh was elected for the 77th district of the Florida House of Representatives, succeeding Joseph W. H. Humphrey. In 1976, he was succeeded by William J. Taylor for the 77th district.

Poorbaugh died in June 1987 in Brooksville, Florida, at the age of 67.

References 

1919 births
1987 deaths
Politicians from Cleveland
Republican Party members of the Florida House of Representatives
20th-century American politicians
Case Western Reserve University alumni
Washington University in St. Louis alumni